Perenethis sindica is a species of spider of the genus Perenethis. It is found in India, Sri Lanka, Nepal, China, and the Philippines.

See also
 List of Pisauridae species

References

Pisauridae
Spiders of Asia
Spiders described in 1897